Capital XTRA (formerly Choice FM) is a Global-owned radio station that broadcasts on 96.9 FM and 107.1 FM in Greater London.  Nationally, it is heard on DAB Digital Radio, Freesat, Sky, Virgin Media and Global Player. It specialises in hip hop, grime and R&B music, and is a commercial competitor to BBC Radio 1Xtra.

History

Choice 96.9
Choice 96.9 began as an independent company in March 1990, broadcasting from studios in Trinity Gardens, Brixton. It was Britain’s first 24-hour black music radio station with a licence, covering South London. The group won a second licence (see Buzz FM) in 1995, bringing a local version of their London offering to Birmingham, on 102.2 FM - in place of Buzz FM.

The advent of digital radio in the UK saw Choice, which already had an active webstream, joining the new MXR consortium and launching a DAB service which anchored London output with news inserts produced by the consortium's news service DNN.

The Birmingham licence was sold to Chrysalis Radio in 1999 and became Galaxy Birmingham, but Choice expanded within the capital in May 2000 when a largely independent North London licence was awarded for Choice 107.1, with the intention of reaching a larger Afro-Caribbean audience outside the limited range of the coverage from Brixton. The station was now broadcasting from Borough High Street, Borough, London.

Having previously been a minority shareholder, Capital Radio Group took full control of the station in February 2004 and moved the station's base from the target service area to the group's central studios in London's Leicester Square. The move resulted in a community march from the coverage area and their studios. It was accused of selling out as some of their DJs were removed and replaced by their Kiss counterparts who play some electronic music.

By 12 October 2004, Capital had received and implemented a merger of their FM licences, operating a service across the capital on the two frequencies and cutting back on the North London-specific music requirements.

The DAB service also became a simulcast of the London station, with the demise of local drop-ins.

Following their takeover of Choice, Capital Radio Group merged with GWR to form GCap Media in 2005. Choice was flagged up as one of the key brands of the new larger network, and the station was made available to digital TV viewers via its addition to Sky (and later to Virgin Media).

GCap were subsequently taken over by Global Radio, who already owned the Galaxy Network of dance/urban music stations. Despite the separate music format and branding, Choice was marketed to advertisers as part of the Galaxy network for package advertising deals. In 2010 Global Radio announced that the Galaxy network stations would be networked with 95.8 Capital FM, leaving Choice as a standalone brand again.

Capital XTRA

On 3 October 2013, Global announced that Choice would be rebranded as Capital XTRA on 7 October, Sister station to Capital and using a naming scheme in reference to BBC Radio 1 and its sister station Radio 1Xtra 

A number of high-profile signings were made, at launch including former BBC Radio 1 and 1Xtra DJ Tim Westwood, and subsequently Kiss FM DJ Jez Welham for the station's flagship show, Capital XTRA In The Morning.

Initially, the station introduced dance music alongside the urban offering provided by Choice FM. However, ratings, particularly in London, suffered, leading to a move back towards the mixture of primarily black music genres that is now heard on the station, which proved successful between 2016 and 2020 in the UK radio listening measurement system, RAJAR.

Capital XTRA refreshed its weekend schedule at the start of 2017, hiring Afrobeats artist and DJ Afro B to host the Afrobeats show, and student radio winner Robert Bruce for a new UK-music led programme, 'Homegrown'. In a coup for the station, legendary hip-hop presenter DJ Semtex moved from BBC Radio 1Xtra to host the same slot on Capital XTRA in October 2018.

In September 2019, a new weekday morning show was launched, hosted by former evening presenter Yinka Bokinni, and Shayna-Marie Birch-Campbell.

On 5th August 2022, Capital XTRA confirmed that Yinka Bokinni had quit the station. Evening show host Robert Bruce was subsequently confirmed to co-host the breakfast slot with incumbent presenter Shayna-Marie.

Capital XTRA Reloaded
A spin-off station, Capital XTRA Reloaded, was launched on 2 September 2019. It featured former Galaxy Birmingham presenter Sacha Brooks as host of the station's flagship show. Available nationally on DAB+, the station plays non-stop old skool hip-hop and R&B anthems.

Listening figures
Having launched with 850,000 listeners, Capital XTRA reached a peak of 1.9 million listeners across the UK in 2019. Following management changes in 2020, listenership dropped to an estimated 1.3 million people.  As of December 2022, the station broadcasts to a weekly audience of 1.4 million, according to RAJAR.

Programming
Capital XTRA plays a mixture of black music genres, including Hip-Hop, R&B, Afrobeats, Grime and Afro-Bashment. Programmes include a mixture of playlisted shows and specialist strands, hosted by a number of well known DJs and music experts.

At Capital XTRA's peak, thematic programming included 'Reloaded', a daily hour of uninterrupted old-skool Hip-Hop and R&B anthems, 'Homegrown', a focus on emerging UK talent including interviews and guest mixes, and 'Chilled', a slow-jamz segment on weeknights on Sunday mornings. Since listening figures began falling in 2021, the majority of such programming has been axed, with output favouring a hegemonic playlist.

Current Presenters

Weekdays
 Robert Bruce & Shayna Marie Birch-Campbell 
 Manny Norte
Toni Phillips
 Yasser 
 Omah Howard 
 Leah Davis 
 Dynamic 
 Chris Ros
 Jay London

Weekends
 Temi Jonah 
 Jojo Silva
 Will Njobvu 
 Remel 
 Kemi Rodgers 
 Manny Norte 
 Teeshow 
 Shayna Marie Birch-Campbell 
 Afro B 
 DJ Semtex 
 Ras Kwame

Events

Between 2016 and 2020, Capital XTRA hosted a number of events to complement its radio broadcasts, including:

Homegrown Live; an artist-led event which featured performances from UK talent at Koko, Camden. Previous performers include AJ Tracey, Aitch, Dappy, Hardy Caprio, Stefflon Don and WSTRN.

See also
List of radio stations in the United Kingdom

References

External links

Global Radio
Radio stations in London
Radio stations established in 1990
Rhythmic contemporary radio stations
1990 establishments in England
Capital (radio network)